Pennywell Farm is a farm tourist attraction just outside the town of Buckfastleigh in South Devon, England.

History 
Pennywell was opened to the public in 1989 by husband and wife, Christopher and Nicola Murray. The idea was that visitors to the farm would not be spectators but that they would be able to have hands-on interaction with the animals.

Activities 
Half hourly hands-on animal activities form the basis of the experience and there are also activities such as a tractor and trailer ride, red rocket ride and pig racing.

It is a centre for the breeding of miniature pigs, a variant of the New Zealand kune kune breed.

References

Farms in Devon
Tourist attractions in Devon
Amusement parks in England